Bill Wells (born c. 1963) is a Scottish bassist, pianist, guitarist and composer.

Biography
Wells is completely self-taught, and began performing in clubs in Scotland in the late 1980s. He began arranging his own work and initially offered these to Bobby Wishart, but when Wishart declined the offer, Wells formed his own Bill Wells Octet, which has included Lindsay Cooper, Alastair Morrow, Robert Henderson, John Longbotham, Phil and Tom Bancroft. Wells' style of experimental jazz takes influences from Brian Wilson, Burt Bacharach, Gil Evans, and Charles Mingus.

Wells has collaborated with several prominent Scottish independent rock and pop musicians, including with David Keenan of Telstar Ponies and John Hogarty of BMX Bandits in the group Phantom Engineer, and with Stevie Jackson and Isobel Campbell of Belle & Sebastian in live performances and also in the studio; Wells recorded the Ghost of Yesterday album with Campbell, and Jackson played on Wells' Incorrect Practice album.

During 2006 he received a Scottish Arts Council 'Tune Up' commission for a tour of Scotland.

Discography

 Stefan Schneider
Pianotapes

 Solo
The Viaduct Tuba Trio Plays The Music of Bill Wells
Lemondale

With Phantom Engineer
Phantom Engineer (1996)

With Future Pilot A.K.A.
The Bill Wells Octet Vs. Future Pilot A.K.A. (1999) Domino

The Bill Wells Trio
Incorrect Practice (2000) Geographic
Also in White (2002) Geographic

With Isobel Campbell
Ghost of Yesterday (2002) Creeping Bent

With Maher Shalal Hash Baz
Osaka Bridge
GOK (2009) Geographic

With Tape
Fugue (2010) Thrill Jockey

With Aidan Moffat
Everything's Getting Older (2011)
The Most Important Place in the World (2015)

As Bill Wells & Friends
Nursery Rhymes (2015) 

EP

Dilf_77 would like to chat
Cruel summer

References

External links
 Scottish Arts Council article on Bill Wells
 Biography at Falkirk Music Scene
 Bill Wells at Domino Records
 Article on Scotland On Sunday 23.06.96 write by Stephen Pastel
 Fugue by Tape & Bill Wells at Inmune Recordings
 Video Kama Aina & Bill Wells | Glasgow Sky
 Video Bill Wells & Lorna Gilfedder & Bradien 

1960s births
Living people
People from Falkirk
Scottish jazz composers
British jazz bandleaders
Scottish jazz pianists
Scottish jazz double-bassists
British jazz double-bassists
Male double-bassists
British male pianists
21st-century pianists
21st-century double-bassists
Male jazz composers
21st-century British male musicians